The Intel Extreme Masters Season 12 – World Championship or IEM Katowice 2018 was the world championship for the twelfth season of the Intel Extreme Masters. It was held at the Spodek in Katowice, Silesian Voivodeship, Poland from February 27–March 4, 2018. The event featured tournaments for Counter-Strike: Global Offensive and StarCraft II.

Counter-Strike: Global Offensive

Participating Teams

Direct Invitees

  Astralis
  Cloud9
  FaZe Clan
  G2 Esports
  Ninjas in Pyjamas
  SK Gaming
  Virtus.pro

Qualifiers

  AVANGAR (Farmskins Championship)
  Heroic (Europe)
  Fnatic (Europe)
  North (Europe)
  Gambit (Europe)
  Team Liquid (North America)
  Renegades (North America)
  TyLoo (Asia)
  ORDER (Oceania)

Format
The group stage used a double elimination format, with the top 3 teams from each group of 8 moving on to the playoffs in the Spodek. The top team in each group earned a bye to the semifinals. All matches were played as best-of-threes except for the first round, which were played as best-of-ones, and the grand finals, which were played as a best-of-five.

Group stage

Group A

Group B

Playoffs

StarCraft II

Participants

Group stage

Playoffs

References

2018 first-person shooter tournaments
Counter-Strike competitions
Intel Extreme Masters